Carrington College may refer to:
Carrington College (US), is a network of for-profit private colleges based out of Sacramento, California
Carrington College, Otago, a hall of residence at the University of Otago, Dunedin, New Zealand